Foleyola is a monotypic genus belonging to the Brassicaceae family. Its only species is Foleyola billotii native to North Africa in Algeria, Mauritania and Morocco.

Taxonomy 
Foleyola billotii was first described by René Maire. The individual flowers have purple petals and are spaced along the inflorescence. Its growth habit is as a shrub. It grows in arid areas. The number of chromosomes is n=16.

References 

Monotypic Brassicaceae genera
Brassicaceae
Taxa named by René Maire